Arthur James "Jim" Yendell (26 November 1910 – 26 May 2004) was a New Zealand businessman and diplomat. He was the High Commissioner of New Zealand to Australia from 1970 to 1973.

He was born in England and educated at Exeter. He owned retail furnishing and cabinet-making firms in Hamilton and had other farming and property interests.

He was active in the National Party from its earliest years; initially in the Waikato Junior Nationals in the 1940s and was on the South Auckland and Waikato Division then the Waikato Division executives. He was on the Dominion publicity committee, and unsuccessfully contested the party's presidency in 1966 against Ned Holt and in 1973 against George Chapman.

He married Dora Mary Fear in 1933.

References  

1910 births
2004 deaths
20th-century New Zealand businesspeople
New Zealand National Party politicians
British emigrants to New Zealand
High Commissioners of New Zealand to Australia
People from Hamilton, New Zealand
20th-century New Zealand politicians